Celedonio B. "Don" Trollano Jr. (born January 7, 1992) is a Filipino professional basketball player for the NLEX Road Warriors of the Philippine Basketball Association (PBA).

College and amateur career

Trollano studied at Adamson University and played for the Adamson Falcons from 2012 to 2014.  He also suited up for the Cagayan Rising Suns of the PBA Developmental League.

Professional career
Trollano was drafted by the Rain or Shine Elasto Painters with the 15th overall pick in the 2015 PBA draft.

On October 25, 2015, Trollano recorded 8 points, 3 rebounds and 4 assists in a win over the Columbian Dyip in his 2nd career game played. On November 11, 2015, Trollano recorded his first double-digit scoring output as he scored 12 points to go along with 3 rebounds in a win over the Alaska Aces. In the 2016 Commissioner's Cup, which was Trollano's rookie year, he won his first championship. 

In 2018, he was traded to the TnT Katropa for Norbert Torres. In Game 3 of the 2019 Commissioner's Cup Finals, he scored a playoff career-high 18 points. The next conference, Trollano scored a career high 19 points in a win against the Columbian Dyip. 

During the 2019 Governor's Cup, he was traded to the Blackwater Elite along with Anthony Semerad and a first round draft pick for Bobby Ray Parks Jr. In 2020, he scored 23 points, 7 rebounds, and 4 assists in a 96–109 loss.

Trollano was on the move again after the NLEX Road Warriors gave the No. 4 pick to Blackwater for him, Maurice Shaw, Roi Sumang, and the Bossing’s 2022 second-round draft pick. The Bossing then transferred the draft selection for Simon Enciso, David Semerad, TNT’s 2023 first-round draft pick and 2024 second-round draft pick in the trade. This reunited him with the coach he won his first championship with, Yeng Guiao.

In the 2022 Philippine Cup, he hit a game-winning shot against TNT. In a win against the Meralco Bolts, he scored 11 of his 19 points in the fourth quarter to help NLEX pull away for the win. In December 2022, Trollano signed a two-year extension with the team, which came after he scored a career-high 26 points in two different games during the Commissioner's Cup. On March 2, 2023, in a Governors' Cup win over the Terrafirma Dyip, he hit a new career-high with 44 points, and broke the PBA's all-time record for consecutive triples without a miss with nine straight as well.

Career statistics

As of the end of 2022–23 season

PBA season-by-season averages

|-
| align=left | 
| align=left | Rain or Shine
| 44 || 11.2 || .390 || .348 || .483 || 1.5 || .7 || .2 || .0 || 3.7
|-
| align=left | 
| align=left | Rain or Shine
| 28 || 11.4 || .402 || .327 || .875 || 2.0 || .4 || .2 || .1 || 4.2
|-
| align=left rowspan=2| 
| align=left | Rain or Shine
| rowspan=2|30 || rowspan=2|17.1 || rowspan=2|.324 || rowspan=2|.258 || rowspan=2|.657 || rowspan=2|3.1 || rowspan=2|.6 || rowspan=2|.4 || rowspan=2|.1 || rowspan=2|5.5
|-
| align=left | TNT
|-
| align=left rowspan=2| 
| align=left | TNT
| rowspan=2|47 || rowspan=2|27.3 || rowspan=2|.394 || rowspan=2|.318 || rowspan=2|.600 || rowspan=2|5.6 || rowspan=2|1.3 || rowspan=2|.5 || rowspan=2|.1 || rowspan=2|9.5
|-
| align=left | Blackwater
|-
| align=left | 
| align=left | Blackwater
| 11 || 29.0 || .376 || .255 || .760 || 8.5 || 1.3 || .3 || .3 || 14.2
|-
| align=left | 
| align=left | NLEX
| 30 || 28.3 || .441 || .355 || .667 || 5.6 || 1.9 || .6 || .3 || 10.5
|-
| align=left | 
| align=left | NLEX
| 37 || 32.7 || .469 || .438 || .804 || 5.4 || 2.4 || .8 || .4 || 16.2
|-class=sortbottom
| align="center" colspan=2 | Career
| 227 || 22.0 || .412 || .347 || .705 || 4.1 || 1.2 || .4 || .2 || 8.6

UAAP 

|-
| align="left" | 2012–13
| align="left" rowspan="3" | Adamson
| 13 || 8.23 || .333 || .273 || .250 || 1.1 || .3 || .1 || – || 1.8
|-
| align="left" | 2013–14
| 14 || 14.5 || .412 || .302 || .636 || 3.4 || .6 || .3 || .3 || 7.4
|-
| align="left" | 2014–15
| 13 || 30.8 || .355 || .211 || .731 || 7.8 || 1.5 || .5 || .8 || 15.8
|-class=sortbottom
| align="center" colspan=2 | Career
| 40 || 17.5 || .370 || .248 || .662 || 6.0 || 3.1 || .6 || .4 || 8.3

Personal life 
Trollano lives with his long-time partner Patricia Palacol and their son, Bryce.

References

1992 births
Living people
Adamson Soaring Falcons basketball players
Basketball players from Catanduanes
Blackwater Bossing players
Filipino men's basketball players
NLEX Road Warriors players
Rain or Shine Elasto Painters draft picks
Rain or Shine Elasto Painters players
Shooting guards
Small forwards
TNT Tropang Giga players